Aladár or Aladar is a masculine given name. It may refer to:

People
 Aladár Andrássy (1827–1903), Hungarian soldier and politician
 Aladár Árkay (1868–1932), Hungarian architect, craftsman and painter
 Aladár Aujeszky (1869–1933), Hungarian veterinary pathologist, professor of bacteriology and microbiologist
 Aladár Donászi (1954–2001), Hungarian robber and serial killer
 Aladár Gerevich (1910–1991), Hungarian fencer, seven-time Olympic gold medalist
 Aladar Imre (1898–1937/1938), Romanian trade unionist, communist militant and member-elect of the Romanian Parliament
 Aladár Körösfői-Kriesch (1863–1920), Hungarian Art Nouveau painter
 Aladár Paasonen (1898–1974), Austro-Hungarian born Finnish military officer
 Aladár Pege (1939–2006), Hungarian jazz double bassist
 Aladár Radó (1882–1914), Hungarian composer of classical music
 Aladár Virág (born 1983), Hungarian footballer
 Aladár Zichy (1864–1937), Hungarian politician

Fictional characters
 Aladár Mézga, in The Mézga Family series
 Aladar, an iguanodon in the film Dinosaur and the video game of the same name

Hungarian masculine given names